Along the Great Divide  is a 1951 American Western film directed by Raoul Walsh and starring Kirk Douglas, Virginia Mayo, John Agar and Walter Brennan. It was Douglas's first Western, a genre that served him well during his long career.

In a 1986 interview with David Letterman, it was one of two movies Kirk told the audience that they "could skip" in his filmography; the other was The Big Trees.

Plot
Federal marshal Len Merrick (Kirk Douglas) and his two deputies rescue cattle rustler and murder suspect Tim "Pop" Keith (Walter Brennan) from a lynch mob headed by grieving rancher Ned Roden, whose beloved son was shot in the back. Merrick insists on taking Keith to Santa Loma to stand trial.

The other ranchers are unwilling to go against a marshal, but Roden vows to administer his own brand of justice. He sends his other son, Dan, to gather his ranch hands while he attends to the burial. Merrick offers to help, but is met with implacable hostility. After Roden leaves, Merrick finds a pocket watch near the body of the dead son.

Keith suggests they spend the night at his home, as it is nearby. Merrick accepts, but has cause to regret his decision when Keith's daughter Ann ambushes them. Merrick is able to disarm her with no harm done. When they leave, Ann decides to go with them.

After he is warned of Roden's intentions by fellow ranchers, Merrick decides to take an unexpected desert route, where he can see if he is being trailed. The tactic fails, however, and the party is overtaken by Roden and his men. In the ensuing gunfight, Merrick's best friend and deputy, Billy Shear, is wounded. Merrick forces Roden to go away by capturing his son Dan. As they travel on, Billy dies.

Merrick and Ann start falling in love. The marshal reveals his unswerving devotion to duty is because the one time he neglected to do so it cost his father his life. He was a deputy to his marshal father, and refused to help escort two prisoners. All three were lynched. Ann sympathizes, but warns him that her first loyalty is to her father.

Meanwhile, Dan convinces the remaining deputy, Lou Gray, to help him escape by the bribe of a ranch. When the group reaches a waterhole, only to find the water undrinkable, a disagreement breaks out. All but Merrick want to head to a river half a day to the south. Worried because the river is on the Mexican border, Merrick insists on continuing on to Santa Loma. Gray quickly draws his gun, however Merrick is faster on the draw and shoots it out of his hand. Now, he has three prisoners to deal with.

After two days without sleep, an exhausted Merrick drops from his horse. Keith grabs his gun, but is unwilling to shoot. When Gray goes for his rifle, Keith kills him, then hands the gun back to Merrick.

Keith is tried in Santa Loma. Merrick tells the jury he is sure Keith is not a killer, though all the evidence and witnesses are against him where a guilty verdict is reached. Just before Keith is to be hanged, Merrick notices the watch he found on the body of the dead brother has an inscription to Dan. Confronted with the proof he had killed his own brother, Dan draws his revolver and grabs Ann as a shield. When his father approaches, Dan kills him then races back into the barn where a gunfight ensues between him and Merrick, then after a time Dan goes out of the barn from the next level and jumps down onto the back of a horse trying to escape but is shot in the back, just like his brother, by Merrick.

Cast
 Kirk Douglas as Marshal Len Merrick
 Virginia Mayo as Ann Keith
 John Agar as Deputy Billy Shear
 Walter Brennan as Tim "Pop" Keith
 Ray Teal as Deputy Lou Gray
 Hugh Sanders as Sam Weaver
 Morris Ankrum as Ned Roden
 James Anderson as Dan Roden
 Charles Meredith as Judge Marlowe
 Kenneth MacDonald uncredited - A ranchhand, and witness for the prosecution at the trial.

References

External links
 
 
 
 
 

1951 films
1951 Western (genre) films
American black-and-white films
American Western (genre) films
1950s English-language films
Films directed by Raoul Walsh
Films scored by David Buttolph
Films shot in Lone Pine, California
Warner Bros. films
1950s American films